Noureddine "Dino" Maamria (born 18 February 1974) is a Tunisian football manager and former player who played as a striker. He is the manager of League One club Burton Albion.

Maamria started his playing career with AS Marsa of Tunisia. He left the club in 1994, and spent a season at CO Transports. He moved to England in 1996, and joined Burnley. Maamria subsequently signed for Glentoran of the IFA Premiership, spending the remainder of 1996–97 season with the club. He joined Conference National club Doncaster Rovers in 1998, spending two years there. He spent the 2000–01 season at Southport, before signing for Leigh RMI in July 2001. After two seasons at Leigh, Maamria signed for Stevenage Borough for a five-figure fee in February 2003. He left the club after making 10 appearances, joining Charleston Battery of the USL First Division. He made nine appearances for Charleston, before rejoining Stevenage in September 2003. Maamria went on to spend three seasons with Stevenage. In July 2006, he rejoined Southport, before signing for Rushden & Diamonds on a free transfer in January 2007. After being released by Rushden at the end of the 2006–07 season, Maamria signed for Northwich Victoria in August 2007.

He made the transition from playing to coaching and management, managing Northwich Victoria, Southport and Nuneaton Town in non-League. During his time as manager of Northwich, Maamria won the Conference Premier Manager of the Year award for the 2007–08 season, during which he guided Northwich to Conference Premier safety having been in administration and 15 points adrift of safety at the time of his appointment. In March 2018, he was appointed as manager of League Two club Stevenage, a position he held until September 2019. Later that month, Maamria was appointed as head coach of Oldham Athletic. He has also been a first-team coach and assistant manager at Stevenage, Preston North End, Newport County and Burton Albion.

Early life
Maamria was born and raised in Tunisia. He is the youngest of seven siblings, having five brothers and one sister. Maamria stated he came from a "poor background", living in a tent until he was four years old. Of his upbringing, Maamria stated — "Yes, I was poor but I loved it and I wouldn’t swap it for the world." He and his siblings would run the 20-mile round trip to school. The family owned two goats, one of which Maamria named 'Gary' after footballer Gary Lineker. Maamria's father worked in the phosphate mines. He always wanted to be a footballer since watching the 1978 FIFA World Cup in which the Tunisian team made their first appearance in the finals. His footballing hero is Diego Maradona, and believes that Maradona is "the best player to have ever played the game".

Club career

Early career
Maamria came through the youth system at AS Marsa in his native Tunisia, making his first-team debut in 1992. He spent two years with the club. One of his final games for AS Marsa was in the Tunisian President Cup Final in 1994, played at Stade El Menzah, beating Étoile Sportive du Sahel 1–0. Maamria has described it as one of the "proudest moments" of his career, owing this to the match being played in front of the Tunisian President, as well as the stadium being full of spectators. He briefly played for CO Transports, who also played in the Tunisian Ligue Professionnelle 1, leaving the club in 1995.

Move to England
He started his English career with Burnley in 1996. While playing for AS Marsa in an away match against Étoile Sportive du Sahel, a tourist resort in the north of Tunisia, he was watched by Burnley's chief scout at the time, Brian Miller, who was on holiday. Miller offered Maamria a two-week trial at Burnley. After scoring in a reserve match against Bradford City, he earned a short-term contract at Burnley, although he failed to make a first-team appearance for the club after he suffered a broken leg. After being released by Burnley at the end of 1996, Maamria signed for Glentoran of the IFA Premiership. Burnley caretaker manager Clive Middlemass had recommended Maamria to Glentoran manager Tommy Cassidy, with the player spending the remainder of the 1996–97 campaign with the club.

Maamria signed for Doncaster Rovers in August 1998. During the 1999–2000 season, a season in which Maamria finished as the club's top goalscorer, he was transfer-listed by Doncaster, and subsequently attracted transfer interest from Cardiff City and Kingstonian, with Cardiff City making a formal bid for the player, although no move materialised. He made 39 appearances and scored 11 goals for the club, and was released by Doncaster in June 2000. He joined Southport in July 2000, making 25 appearances and scoring five goals for the club. He joined Leigh RMI in August 2001, combining playing for the club with a coaching job at his former employers, Burnley. He made 58 appearances and scored 26 goals for the club. He joined Stevenage Borough for a five-figure fee in February 2003. After making 10 appearances and scoring five goals, he joined Charleston Battery in the USL First Division, where he failed to score in nine appearances.

He rejoined Stevenage in September 2003 after receiving international clearance. During this spell with the club, he made 96 appearances and scored 33 goals. He rejoined Southport in July 2006. Rushden & Diamonds manager Graham Westley wanted to sign Maamria in December 2006, and Southport denied having received an official approach for him from Rushden. Southport said they wanted an improved offer from Rushden if they were to let Maamria leave. After making 17 appearances and scoring six goals with Southport, he joined Rushden on a one-and-a-half year on a free transfer in January.

International career
Maamria made one appearance for the Tunisia under-21 team in 1991.

Managerial career

Early coaching career
Maamria's first experience coaching came at Burnley in the summer of 1997 where he worked as an academy coach to help "find, produce and develop youngsters" within the youth system at Burnley. He helped develop players such as Jay Rodriguez during his time there. He gained his UEFA 'B' licence in 1999 and earned his 'A' licence two years later, both whilst also playing in the early stages of his career in England. In June 2000, Maamria went on a two-week course at Lilleshall in order to get an FA coaching badge.

Northwich Victoria
Whilst playing for Conference Premier club Northwich Victoria towards the end of his playing career, Maamria was made caretaker manager in October 2007. At the time of his appointment, Northwich were in last place in the Conference Premier having lost 15 of their opening 17 matches to start the season, drawing the other two, and were 15 points adrift of safety. They had also just entered administration. On the situation, Maamria stated — "We can't do anything about things off the pitch but we can change results on the pitch. I said to the players there are two things we can do: we can either make excuses and say that we have had financial problems and lie down and die or we can go out and perform and try and beat the teams in front of us". In his second game in charge, Northwich won their first match of the season, a 3–1 away victory at Southport in the FA Cup on 27 October 2007.

A month later, on 24 November 2007, Northwich secured their first league win of the season with a 1–0 home victory against Rushden & Diamonds. Northwich's prospective new owners said they wanted to make him the club's permanent manager once their takeover was complete. Following the completion of their takeover on 11 December 2007, he was confirmed as the club's permanent manager. Northwich won six matches out of eleven and went on an eight-match unbeaten run in March 2008. Two victories within the space of three days in April 2008, the latter a 2–1 away win against former club Stevenage, meant that Northwich had secured their Conference Premier status for another year. The survival, achieved with a game to spare, resulted in Maamria winning the Conference Manager of the Year for the 2007–08 season.

Following on from securing Northwich's safety the previous season, Maamria remained at the club for the start of the 2008–09 season. Northwich started the season by losing seven out of their first 10 matches. Maamria was placed on gardening leave for "reasons still unconfirmed" in September 2008, and was subsequently sacked by Northwich "following an internal investigation surrounding his suspension" on 23 October 2008.

Coaching spells
Maamria subsequently rejoined former club Stevenage as part of Graham Westley's coaching team in November 2008, appointed as the club's first-team coach. Shortly after joining, Maamria recommended Stevenage sign Mark Roberts, who he had previously managed at Northwich, with Roberts stating he joined the club because of Maamria's belief and desire. Maamria's appointment, alongside a number of new signings such as Roberts and Jon Ashton, coincided with an upturn in form for Stevenage, with the club going on a club record 24-game unbeaten run stretching from December 2008 to April 2009. During the season, he was also included as part of the playing squad, helping the club to its first ever Herts Senior Cup title in April 2009, scoring twice in the final against Cheshunt in a 2–1 victory. Later that month, he made a 90th-minute appearance in Stevenage's 1–0 victory over Ebbsfleet United, in what turned out to be his last professional appearance. Maamria earned his first piece of silverware as first-team coach when the club won the FA Trophy at Wembley Stadium, defeating York City 2–0 in the final on 9 May 2009.

In his first full season back at Stevenage in his coaching role, the club won the Conference Premier title by finishing the season as champions and were subsequently promoted to the Football League for the first time in their history. During the season, Maamria also featured on the bench in Stevenage's match away to Eastbourne Borough in March 2010. The club earned back-to-back promotions into League One during the 2010–11 season after winning the League Two play-offs, beating Torquay United 1–0 in the final at Old Trafford on 28 May 2011. That season, following a shortage of players for Stevenage's match against Lincoln City in September 2010, Maamria was assigned the number 27 shirt and was as an unused substitute in the club's 1–0 victory.

In January 2012, Maamria joined fellow League One club Preston North End as first-team coach after Westley was appointed as the club's manager. Despite a squad overhaul, the coaching team did not replicate the success that they had experienced at Stevenage, and he left the club in February 2013 after Westley was sacked. A month later, Maamria rejoined Stevenage as assistant manager to Westley, who had returned for a third spell in-charge of the Hertfordshire club. During the 2014–15 season, Stevenage made the League Two play-offs, losing to Southend United over two legs at the semi-final stage in May 2015. A week after the defeat to Southend, Maamria left the club alongside Westley when the club appointed Teddy Sheringham as manager. During his time out of the game in 2015, Maamria earned the UEFA Pro Licence, the highest certificate available in coaching. Two months into the 2016–17 season, on 10 October 2016, Maamria was once again appointed as assistant manager to Westley, this time at League Two club Newport County. He left the club when Westley was sacked on 9 March 2017.

Southport
Maamria was appointed manager of National League club Southport on 19 November 2015, his first managerial role since keeping Northwich Victoria in the same division seven years earlier. He returned to Southport having played for the club during three separate spells in his playing career. Southport were sitting in the relegation zone at the time of his appointment having won three matches out of 20 during the opening months of the season, and were eight points adrift of safety. His first match as Southport manager was on 21 November 2015, as Southport secured a late 1–0 away victory over Welling United. Under Maamria's management, the club won eight out of their next 10 matches, also recording a nine-match unbeaten run. Maamria was subsequently named Manager of the Month for December 2015. He left Southport on 14 March 2016, five months after joining, citing "family and travel reasons" as the reasons behind his departure. Southport were in 17th position in the league at the time of his exit, eight points above the relegation zone.

Nuneaton Town
After leaving his coaching role at Newport, Maamria stated he had "plenty of chances to get back into football", but was waiting for the right opportunity. He was named as manager of Nuneaton Town of the National League North on 28 October 2017. Similarly to when he joined both Northwich and Southport as manager, Nuneaton were struggling in the league, sitting one place above the relegation zone having won just four league matches in the opening  months of the 2017–18 season. Maamria's first game as manager of Nuneaton was a 2–1 away defeat to FC United of Manchester on the same day his appointment was announced. He discussed a need to "manage expectations" given the club's lowly position and highlighted the defence as an area in need of improvement if the club were to start climbing the table. A 2–1 victory over promotion-chasing Harrogate Town on 9 January 2018 served as the catalyst for Nuneaton to produce a 10-game unbeaten run that lasted over two months, conceding six goals during the run. At the time of Maamria's departure in March 2018, Nuneaton had moved to within five points of the play-off places.

Stevenage
Maamria was appointed as manager of League Two club Stevenage on 20 March 2018, having previously played for the club and been first-team coach and assistant manager in separate spells. Maamria's first match in charge was a 1–0 home defeat to Colchester United on 24 March 2018. He secured his first win as Stevenage manager with a 4–1 home victory over local rivals Barnet on 2 April 2018. He was sacked on 9 September 2019 after a poor start to the season.

Oldham Athletic
On 19 September 2019, Maamria was appointed as head coach of League Two club Oldham Athletic.  On 31 July 2020, after 10 months in charge, Maamia was sacked as manager of Oldham.

Burton Albion
On 8 January 2021, Maamaria was appointed as assistant manager at League One Club Burton Albion to Jimmy Floyd Hasselbaink. The pair oversaw a positive start to their tenure, earning 9 league victories in their first 12 matches, including a 6 match winning streak in February and March to steer the club towards safety and out of the relegation zone. Mammria and Hasselbaink would earn praise for their quick turn around in results given Burton's poor start to the season which included 2 league victories in their first 21 matches, at which point Hasselbaink was appointed manager to replace Jake Buxton.

Following Hasselbaink's resignation on 5 September 2022, Maamria was placed in temporary charge of first team matters.

Personal life
He also enjoys listening to hip hop and R&B music. During his time playing at Leigh RMI, Maamria also worked as an Ethnic Minorities Development Officer at Turf Moor.

Career statistics

Playing statistics

A.  The "Other" column constitutes appearances and goals (including those as a substitute) in the FA Trophy, Football League Trophy and play-offs.

Managerial statistics

Honours

Player
Stevenage
FA Trophy: 2008–09

Individual
Football Conference Goalscorer of the Month: August 2002

Manager
Individual
Conference Premier Manager of the Year: 2007–08

References

External links

1974 births
Living people
Tunisian footballers
Tunisian emigrants to the United Kingdom
Association football forwards
AS Marsa players
Doncaster Rovers F.C. players
Southport F.C. players
Leigh Genesis F.C. players
Stevenage F.C. players
Charleston Battery players
Rushden & Diamonds F.C. players
Northwich Victoria F.C. players
National League (English football) players
A-League (1995–2004) players
Tunisian football managers
Northwich Victoria F.C. managers
Southport F.C. managers
Nuneaton Borough F.C. managers
Stevenage F.C. managers
Preston North End F.C. non-playing staff
Newport County A.F.C. non-playing staff
Oldham Athletic A.F.C. managers
Burton Albion F.C. non-playing staff
National League (English football) managers
Tunisian expatriate football managers
Glentoran F.C. players
Burton Albion F.C. managers